Infant Jesus School is an educational institution in Saharanpur,India that concentrates on the science and commerce stream.   Known as IJS, the school is affiliated to I.S.C (I.C.S.E), New Delhi.

References

Catholic schools in India
High schools and secondary schools in Uttar Pradesh
Christian schools in Uttar Pradesh
Education in Saharanpur
1983 establishments in Uttar Pradesh
Educational institutions established in 1983